"Hallelujah" is the third single from the album Dying for a Heart by Krystal Meyers. "Hallelujah" peaked at No 28 on the Christian Rock chart.

About "Hallelujah"
"Hallelujah" is a worship song written by Krystal Meyers and her guitarist Brian Hitt, from the album Dying for a Heart and the video is included on the Make Some Noise DVD.

References

2006 singles
Krystal Meyers songs
Song recordings produced by Ian Eskelin
2006 songs
Essential Records (Christian) singles
Songs written by Krystal Meyers